Donald L. Weaver is an American physician. He is a rear admiral in the United States Public Health Service Commissioned Corps and public health administrator who served as the acting Surgeon General of the United States. Weaver succeeded Steven K. Galson in October 2009, in expectation of a holdup by the United States Senate in confirming Regina Benjamin as surgeon general. Before being appointed as Acting Surgeon General, he served as the deputy associate administrator for primary health care in the Health Resources and Services Administration.

Career

Dr. Weaver has a lifelong commitment to improving the health of underserved communities and vulnerable populations through the provision of community-responsive, culturally competent care by interdisciplinary teams.

Dr. Weaver is currently the senior advisor for the clinical workforce for the National Association of Community Health Centers, where he served as the interim chief medical officer from 2012 until 2013.  In addition to leading their Clinical Affairs Division, he oversaw center's activities regarding clinical workforce issues, residency and medical school training.  He also provided technical assistance to primary care associations, residency programs, and hospitals regarding health profession training issues.

Prior to that, Dr. Weaver had a distinguished career as a Commissioned officer in the United States Public Health Service, retiring with the rank of assistant surgeon general in January 2011.  Dr. Weaver began his career in the Public Health Service in 1975 as a National Health Service Corps volunteer physician in Tooele, Utah.  During his career he served in a variety of regional and national leadership positions with both health professions and service delivery programs, including director of the Division of Medicine, Director of the National Health Service Corps, and deputy associate administrator for primary health care at the Health Resources and Services Administration.

Education
Weaver is a 1973 graduate of Harvard Medical School, and also completed a two-year pediatric residency at Boston's Children's Hospital Medical Center.

Awards
Weaver has been awarded the Public Health Service Distinguished Service Medal, Meritorious Service Medal, and the Surgeon General's Exemplary Service Medal in recognition of his achievements.

References

External links
Biography of the Acting Surgeon General Rear Admiral Donald L. Weaver, M.D.

Living people
Harvard Medical School alumni
Surgeons General of the United States
Year of birth missing (living people)
Recipients of the Public Health Service Distinguished Service Medal